The Kara-Kirghiz Autonomous Oblast, abbreviated as Kara-Kirghiz AO or KAO in the former region of Soviet Central Asia, was created on 14 October 1924 within the Russian SFSR from the predominantly Kyrgyz part of the Turkestan Autonomous Soviet Socialist Republic. On 15 May 1925 it was renamed into the Kirghiz Autonomous Oblast. On 11 February 1926 it was reorganized into the Kirghiz ASSR (not to be confused with the Kirghiz ASSR that was the first name of Kazakh ASSR). On 5 December 1936 it became the Kirghiz SSR, one of the constituent republics of the Soviet Union.

Etymology
Kara-Kirghiz is a former name for the Kyrgyz that literally means "the black Kirghiz (Kyrgyz)", in reference to the colour of tents the nomads used.

References

Post–Russian Empire states
Autonomous oblasts of the Soviet Union
States and territories established in 1924
Kirghiz Soviet Socialist Republic
1924 establishments in the Soviet Union
1926 disestablishments in the Soviet Union

de:Kirgisische Sozialistische Sowjetrepublik#Entwicklung